The Salem Parkway is an  freeway in the U.S. state of North Carolina, serving the cities of Winston-Salem and Kernersville. It is signed as U.S. Route 421 (US 421) for its entire length, though it is also concurrent with US 158 in downtown Winston-Salem and North Carolina Highway 150 (NC 150) between Winston-Salem and Kernersville. Originally known as the East–West Expressway, it was designated as part of Interstate 40 (I-40) and opened in 1958, becoming the first section of Interstate Highway in the state. I-40 was rerouted onto a new alignment bypassing Winston-Salem and Kernersville in 1992, at which time the road was designated Interstate 40 Business, nicknamed Business 40.

Beginning in November 2018, a  section of the freeway in downtown Winston-Salem between Peters Creek Parkway (NC 150) and the John Gold Memorial Expressway (US 52) was closed for reconstruction to rebuild the substandard roadway, exit and entrance ramps, and bridges. The section east of Main Street reopened August 30, 2019. As part of the project, the Business 40 designation was decommissioned and replaced with the name Salem Parkway, which had been chosen by popular vote in 2016. This included changing guide signs to include the new name, as well as renumbering exits to follow the mileage of US 421. The name change went into effect on February 2, 2020, when the road reopened, though signage outside of the project area had been changed in late December 2019.

Route description
The Salem Parkway runs east-west through Winston-Salem and Kernersville, though it is designated on signs as the north-south US 421, with north on the signage aligning to west, and vice versa.

The parkway begins on US 421 at Exit 238, the interchange with I-40 in Winston-Salem. The road runs northeast carrying US 421, meeting Silas Creek Parkway (NC 67) at a cloverleaf interchange before reaching an interchange with Stratford Road (US 158). From here, the parkway turns east concurrent with US 158, continuing east and joining NC 150 at Peters Creek Parkway. In downtown Winston-Salem, the Salem Parkway meets Marshall Street and Cherry Street before passing under the Strollway. A half-interchange allows access to and from the one-way northbound Main Street, with only a westbound off-ramp and eastbound on-ramp. The parkway intersects the John Gold Memorial Expressway (US 52/NC 8, though NC 8 is not signed at this interchange) at a cloverleaf interchange and meets Martin Luther King Jr. Drive immediately after.

Leaving the downtown Winston-Salem area, US 158 exits the Salem Parkway onto Reidsville Road at a partial interchange, with the parkway continuing east concurrent with US 421 and NC 150. Entering Kernersville, the parkway comes to a partially built interchange with the under-construction Winston-Salem Northern Beltway (NC 74). Continuing through the town, the Salem Parkway meets South Main Street and then NC 66. The road then passes diamond interchange with Macy Grove Road with NC 150 exiting the parkway. The Salem Parkway exits Forsyth County, before ending at a half-interchange with I-40 south of Colfax, with only an eastbound entrance and westbound exit on I-40. US 421 continues on I-40 toward Greensboro.

History
After the consolidation of Winston and Salem in 1913, the combined city was not only a merger of local government but a joining of two different road systems. By the 1940s, Winston-Salem grew to become the largest manufacturing hub in the state, thanks to companies like R. J. Reynolds Tobacco Company and the P.H. Hanes Knitting Company; while multiple highways connected the city, there was no road that directly went from one end to the other without making turns and as a result traffic congestion was a constant in the downtown area. From 1946 to 1956, various traffic pattern studies were performed and plans created that reshaped the city for the next fifty years.

East–West Expressway

In 1954, Winston-Salem gave the state $1 million to buy right-of-way for what was called the East–West Expressway; construction began that same year. Though it was planned to become a new routing of US 158, that changed two years later, when the Federal Aid Highway Act of 1956 was passed and North Carolina was allocated  for their share of the Interstate Highway System;  was subsequently allocated for a route from the Tennessee state line, through Asheville and Winston-Salem, to Greensboro. With the designation of I-40, the East–West Expressway would become the first completed section of Interstate in the state.

On January 6, 1958, the first  section of the East–West Expressway was opened, connecting between Cloverdale Avenue and Main Street. Because of the novelty, local newspapers ran a series of stories and diagrams on how to use the expressway, educating the public on how on-ramps and off-ramps work. Designated as I-40, the expressway soon ran concurrently with US 158 in 1959, from Stratford Road to Marshall (westbound) and Cherry (eastbound) streets. In 1960, the expressway was extended west into Yadkin County, at NC 801, and east to Reidsville Road. In 1961, US 421 was rerouted from Pfafftown and downtown Winston-Salem onto new freeway that connected directly with the expressway, then continued easterly running concurrently with I-40. In 1962, US 158 was realigned to continue along the expressway to Reidsville Road, its former alignment became US 158 Business (decommissioned in 1970). East of Reidsville Road, I-40/US 421 was extended onto new freeway to Kernersville, where it then linked with second built section of I-40 (late 1958) and continued towards Greensboro.

Interstate 40 Business

After 1958, the East–West Expressway segment of I-40 changed little while Interstate standards have changed considerably in regards to safety and faster speeds. In the 1980s, a study with the city and state concluded that construction of a new route was preferable to widening and modernizing the freeway through Winston-Salem. The state therefore lobbied the Federal Highway Administration (FHWA), arguing that since this section predated the 1956 Act, it never received federal highway dollars for its development and construction, thus I-40 was incomplete in Winston-Salem. In October 1988, they were able to convince the FHWA, and Governor James G. Martin announced federal approval of $114.1 million for I-40 to be relocated onto new bypass south of Winston-Salem. In November 1992, the  Winston-Salem Bypass was completed and opened; I-40 was officially rerouted at that time and a new designation was given to the East–West Expressway, Interstate 40 Business.

Hawthorne curve
Blame for the curve mostly fell on then Winston-Salem Mayor Marshall Kurfees, who is believed to have ordered the curve to protect political allies who owned businesses on Hawthorne Road and First Street. Kurfees spent the rest of his life denying the allegation, stating that the engineers designed it while he had no input to the project. Over the years, several studies were done and various little fixes were made to improve the situation including a reduced  speed zone, better guardrails and the installation of blinking lights and flashing warning signs. In January 1998, the first major improvement in 40 years started with the realignment of Hawthorne Curve. At a cost of $26 million, construction lasted for two years building a new overpass and reshaping the sharp curve to a more gentle one. It was completed seven months early in the middle of 2000.

Brief Greensboro extension
In February 2008, I-40 was rerouted onto new freeway south of Greensboro, becoming part of the Greensboro Urban Loop. The old route through Greensboro became an extension of I-40 Business, with a  hidden concurrency along I-40/US 421, between exits 206 and 212. This extended the route , ending at a new terminus with I-85/I-40, near McLeansville.

However, NCDOT officials received many complaints by local residents and motorists on the confusion between the new I-40 and I-40 Business. Another issue was that funding for construction and repairs on the old route was slashed since it was no longer designated as an Interstate (Interstate business routes are not officially part of the Interstate Highway System) On September 12, 2008, with permission from the FHWA, I-40 was moved back to its old route through Greensboro, decommissioning Business 40 through Greensboro.

Macy Grove Road interchange
Construction began in June 2013 on the first phase of a project to extend Macy Grove Road around the east side of Kernersville. Macy Grove Road, which previously passed over Business 40 with no interchange and ended at Old Greensboro Road, was extended to a temporary terminus at a connector to East Mountain Street, with a diamond interchange built connecting it to Business 40. The extension and interchange opened in May 2015, at which point the former partial interchange with East Mountain Street immediately east of the NC 66/NC 150 interchange was closed and demolished and the westbound roadway through the former interchange realigned closer to the eastbound roadway. In October 2020, NC 150 was rerouted onto Macy Grove Road from the Salem Parkway interchange to the Main Street intersection as Macy Grove Road was extended north from its section built in 2015.

Salem Parkway
 
In 2006, the North Carolina Department of Transportation (NCDOT) decided to rebuild the freeway between Fourth Street and Church Street, which covers most of the original  section of the East–West Expressway from 1958. For the next ten years, NCDOT made several studies and a series of public meetings before awarding a design-build contract with Flatiron Constructors, Inc./Blythe Development Company Joint Venture and HDR Engineering, Inc., in September 2016, to complete the final design and construct the project. Considered as a $100 million do-over, the project included: replacing the existing roadway pavement, modernizing entrance and exit ramps, replacing nine vehicular bridges, adding two pedestrian bridges, lengthening the acceleration and deceleration lanes between ramps and widening existing roadway shoulders and adding new ones. When Salem Parkway opens, contractors will still be working on final touches. The opening speed limit will be .

NCDOT had also decided that once construction was completed, that I-40 Business would be decommissioned and a new name would be given to the freeway alongside the existing US 421 designation. The rationale was the continued confusion locals and travelers have between I-40 and I-40 Business. In November 2015, the residents of Winston-Salem metro area were allowed to submit a nomination for a new name, with a January 30, 2016, deadline. A selection committee, which included appointments from Winston-Salem and Kernersville, whittled the list to just four for another public vote. The eventual four finalist names were: Golden Leaf Parkway, alluding to the region's tobacco-growing and processing heritage; Innovation Highway, showing the high-tech aspirations of the area; Piedmont Corridor, identifying geographic location in a highly developed part of the state, and Salem Parkway, which refers to the Moravian settlement founded in 1766. On October 21, 2016, Governor Pat McCrory announced, at the project's ground breaking event, the new name of the freeway as the Salem Parkway; which was the overwhelming favorite, receiving 53% of the vote. This name change took place when the highway reopened on February 2, 2020, though new signs will show the Salem Parkway name once they are installed.

Downtown reconstruction

After two years of intermittent closures, the new Peters Creek Parkway bridge was opened on November 12, 2018. On November 17, the second phase began with the complete shutdown of Business 40 between Peters Creek Parkway and John Gold Memorial Expressway (US 52/US 311/NC 8); three alternate routes were set up through the downtown area for locals while travelers are encouraged to remain on mainline I-40.

The Broad Street interchange was permanently closed and removed, the Cherry Street interchange will be modified with Marshall Street, and the Main Street interchange was modified to have only a southbound on-ramp and a northbound off-ramp. Two pedestrian bridges will also be completed, one of which will replace Green Street Bridge, and a Strollway Bridge adjacent to Liberty Street.

On August 30, 2019, the section east of Main Street was opened. Reconstruction of the downtown segment was completed February 2, 2020.

Exit list
Exit numbers were renumbered to reflect U.S. 421's milemarkers.

References

External links

 
 
 Business 40 Home Page

Interstate 40
U.S. Route 421
Transportation in Winston-Salem, North Carolina
Transportation in Forsyth County, North Carolina
Transportation in Guilford County, North Carolina